"Close to You" is a song by Italian Eurodance project Whigfield, performed by Danish-born Sannie Charlotte Carlson and released on 4 September 1995 as the fourth single from her first album, Whigfield (1995). It was her first ballad and a top 20 hit in Scotland, Denmark, Ireland, Spain and the UK. On the Eurochart Hot 100, it reached number 67. A 12" Vinyl release has a track titled "Close to You (DMC Remix)", but however this track appears to be "Think of You".

Critical reception
Larry Flick from Billboard wrote about the song, "Wisely, Whigfield broadens its stylistic palette slightly by issuing a jam fueled by a chugging faux-funk beat. The wall of glistening keyboards raises the sugar quotient of the song's cutie-pie vocals and "ooh-baby-baby" lyrics to potentially diabetic heights. Is it good for ya? Nah! But what guilty pleasure ever is?" James Masterton for Dotmusic viewed it as "a soaring romantic ballad which calls for a powerful voice that Whigfield just about manages to supply." Ross Jones from The Guardian described it as a "Streisand-esque slowie". A reviewer from Music Week gave it two out of five, saying that "after a trio of delightful frothy pop successes, Whigfield goes balladeering but her harsh voice jars with the undoubted sweetness of the song."

Chart performance
Not as successful as her first three singles, "Close to You" still was a moderate hit in Europe. It was a top 20 hit in Denmark (18), Ireland (18), Scotland (11), Spain (19) and the United Kingdom. In the latter, the single peaked at number 13 on 10 September 1995, in its second week at the UK Singles Chart. Additionally, it also entered the top 40 in Iceland (33) and top 100 in Germany (90). On the Eurochart Hot 100, "Close to You" reached its best position as number 67.

Music video
A music video was produced to promote the single. It pays homage to the paintings of American artist Edward Hopper such as Automat, Morning Sun, and Office in a Small City. It begins with Carlson glancing and singing at an open window without glass while she is lounging in bed. Other scenes are showing her performing at a grand piano while a man is playing on it. Occasionally, several different people are seen lying, sitting or standing alone on their own by the open window. All of them in the same old style. In the end, these people are sitting next to each other outside, all of them lounging in the sun, finally slowly fading away until the chairs are empty and leaves are blowing in the wind. The video was later published on YouTube in March 2013, and had generated more than 1.7 million views as of February 2023.

Track listings

 UK: CD-maxi 1: Systematic
 "Close to You" 4:07
 "Saturday Night" (Classic Vocal Mix) 9:18
 "Another Day" (The French Remix) 4:39

 UK: CD-maxi 2: Systematic
 "Close to You" 4:07
 "It's Alright" 4:42
 "Saturday Night"/"Another Day" (The Canadian Mega Mix) 10:20

 Spain: CD-maxi: Systemic
 "Close to You" (Single Version) 4:07
 "Close to You" (Down Town Remix) 4:56
 "Think of You" (DMC Remix) 7:07

 Australian EP
 "Close to You" (Radio Edit)
 "Close to You" (Downtown Remix)
 "Ain't it Blue" (Original Version)

Other versions
 "Close to You" (Radio Special Version) - Radio version of Downtown Remix
 "Close to You" (Down Town Extra Mix) - Longer version of the Downtown Remix
 "Junto A Ti"
 "Close to You"

Charts

References

1995 singles
1995 songs
Whigfield songs
Songs written by Ann Lee (singer)
Songs written by Larry Pignagnoli
Pop ballads
English-language Italian songs